Gonatogyne is a genus of plants in the family Phyllanthaceae first described as a genus in 1873. It contains only one known species,  Gonatogyne brasiliensis, endemic to southeastern Brazil. It is dioecious, with male and female flowers on separate plants.

References

Phyllanthaceae
Monotypic Malpighiales genera
Phyllanthaceae genera
Endemic flora of Brazil
Taxa named by Johannes Müller Argoviensis
Taxa named by Henri Ernest Baillon
Dioecious plants